A Cosmic Rhythm with Each Stroke is an album by trumpeter Wadada Leo Smith and pianist Vijay Iyer which was released in March 2016 on ECM Records.

Reception
At Metacritic, that assigns a normalized rating out of 100 to reviews from mainstream critics, the album received an average score of 82, based on seven reviews, which indicates "universal acclaim".

Thom Jurek in his review for Allmusic says that:

They also selected it as one of their Favorite Jazz Albums of 2016.

In The Guardian, John Fordham gave this album four stars and says that:

Track listing
ECM Records – ECM 2420.

Personnel
Vijay Iyer – piano, fender rhodes, electronics
Wadada Leo Smith – trumpet

References

2016 albums
Vijay Iyer albums
Wadada Leo Smith albums
ECM Records albums
Albums produced by Manfred Eicher